The 2009 Players Championship was a golf tournament in Florida on the PGA Tour, held  at TPC Sawgrass in Ponte Vedra Beach, southeast of Jacksonville. It was the 36th Players Championship.

Henrik Stenson shot a bogey-free 66 in the final round to win at 276 (−12), four strokes ahead of Ian Poulter. Alex Čejka led by five strokes after the third round, but went out in 42 and finished in a tie for ninth. Stenson was the third European to win the title, after Sergio García the previous year and Sandy Lyle in 1987.

Due to 83 players making the halfway cut (top 70 and ties), a second cut was initiated after the third round.

Defending champion Sergio García finished ten strokes back, in a tie for 22nd place.

Venue

Course layout

Field
Brad Adamonis, Michael Allen, Robert Allenby, Stephen Ames, Stuart Appleby, Tommy Armour III, Woody Austin, Eric Axley, Aaron Baddeley, Briny Baird, Cameron Beckman, Matt Bettencourt, Jason Bohn, Michael Bradley, Bart Bryant, Jonathan Byrd, Ángel Cabrera, Chad Campbell, Michael Campbell, Paul Casey, Alex Čejka, K. J. Choi, Daniel Chopra, Stewart Cink, Tim Clark, Fred Couples, Ben Crane, Ben Curtis, Brian Davis, Luke Donald, Jason Dufner, Ken Duke, Steve Elkington, Ernie Els, Bob Estes, Ross Fisher, Steve Flesch, Fred Funk, Jim Furyk, Sergio García, Brian Gay, Lucas Glover, Mathew Goggin, Retief Goosen, Paul Goydos, Nathan Green, Bill Haas, Todd Hamilton, Pádraig Harrington, Dudley Hart, J. J. Henry, Tim Herron, Charley Hoffman, J. B. Holmes, Charles Howell III, Ryuji Imada, Trevor Immelman, Freddie Jacobson, Thongchai Jaidee, Dustin Johnson, Richard S. Johnson, Zach Johnson, Robert Karlsson, Martin Kaymer, Jerry Kelly, Anthony Kim, Søren Kjeldsen, Jeff Klauk, Greg Kraft, Cliff Kresge, Matt Kuchar, Martin Laird, Justin Leonard, Michael Letzig, Peter Lonard, Davis Love III, Steve Lowery, Will MacKenzie, Hunter Mahan, John Mallinger, Steve Marino, Troy Matteson, Billy Mayfair, Scott McCarron, Graeme McDowell, Rory McIlroy, Parker McLachlin, George McNeill, Rocco Mediate, John Merrick, Phil Mickelson, Ryan Moore, Kevin Na, Sean O'Hair, Nick O'Hern, Joe Ogilvie, Geoff Ogilvy, Jeff Overton, Ryan Palmer, Rod Pampling, Corey Pavin, Pat Perez, Tom Pernice Jr., Kenny Perry, Tim Petrovic, Carl Pettersson, Scott Piercy, Ian Poulter, Brett Quigley, Jeff Quinney, Chez Reavie, John Rollins, Andrés Romero, Justin Rose, Rory Sabbatini, Adam Scott, John Senden, Webb Simpson, Jeev Milkha Singh, Vijay Singh, Heath Slocum, Henrik Stenson, Kevin Streelman, Steve Stricker, Kevin Sutherland, Vaughn Taylor, Nicholas Thompson, David Toms, D. J. Trahan, Marc Turnesa, Bo Van Pelt, Scott Verplank, Camilo Villegas, Johnson Wagner, Nick Watney, Bubba Watson, Boo Weekley, D. A. Weibring, Mike Weir, Charlie Wi, Tim Wilkinson, Dean Wilson, Mark Wilson, Tiger Woods, Yang Yong-eun

Round summaries

First round
Thursday, May 7, 2009

Second round
Friday, May 8, 2009

Third round
Saturday, May 9, 2009

Final leaderboard
Sunday, May 10, 2009

Alex Čejka held a five-shot lead entering the final round, but quickly faltered with a six-over front nine and slumped to a closing 79. This opened the door for many, and Henrik Stenson pulled clear with a bogey-free 66 for a four-stroke victory.

Scorecard
Final round

Cumulative tournament scores, relative to par

Source:

References

External links
The Players Championship website
Full results

2009
2009 in golf
2009 in American sports
2009 in sports in Florida
May 2009 sports events in the United States